was a fudai feudal domain under the Tokugawa shogunate of Edo period Japan.  It is located in southern Mutsu Province, Honshū. The domain was centered at Tanagura Castle, located in what is now part of the town of Tanagura in Fukushima Prefecture.

History
During the Sengoku period, Tanagura was an outpost of the Satake clan, who built the mountain-top Akadake Castle near what would later become Tanagura Castle. After the Satake were defeated and transferred to Dewa Province by Tokugawa Ieyasu, the area was awarded to Tachibana Muneshige. Following the Siege of Osaka, the domain was awarded to Niwa Nagashige, who was ordered to build a completely new castle by Shōgun Tokugawa Hidetada. The Niwa were followed by the Naitō clan, who continued to develop the castle and its surrounding castle town; however, under the Tokugawa shogunate the domain saw frequent changes of daimyō. 

During the Bakumatsu period, Matsudaira Yasuhide was transferred to Kawagoe Domain, and Abe Masakiyo was transferred from neighbouring Shirakawa Domain. During the Boshin War, the domain was a member of the pro-Tokugawa Ōuetsu Reppan Dōmei, but fell to imperial forces in 1868 after only one day of fighting. In July 1871, with the abolition of the han system, Tanagura Domain briefly became Tanagura Prefecture, and was merged into the newly created Fukushima Prefecture. Under the new Meiji government, Abe Masakoto, the final daimyō of Tanagura Domain was given the kazoku peerage title of shishaku (viscount).

Bakumatsu period holdings
As with most domains in the han system, Tanagura Domain consisted of several discontinuous territories calculated to provide the assigned kokudaka, based on periodic cadastral surveys and projected agricultural yields.

Mutsu Province (Iwaki Province)
62 villages in Shirakawa District
26 villages in Kikuta District
15 villages in Naraha District
3 villages in Iwasaki District
1 village in Iwaki District
Mutsu Province (Iwashiro Province)
26 villages in Date District
2 villages in Shinobu District
Dewa Province (Uzen Province)
12 villages in Murayama District
Harima Province 
18 villages in Katō District

List of daimyōs

See also
 List of Han

Notes

References
The content of this article was largely derived from that of the corresponding article on Japanese Wikipedia.

External links
 Tanagura on "Edo 300 HTML" (9 Oct. 2007)

1603 establishments in Japan
1871 disestablishments in Japan
Domains of Japan
History of Fukushima Prefecture
Iwashiro Province
Matsudaira clan
Matsui-Matsudaira clan
Naitō clan
Niwa clan
Ogasawara clan
Ōuetsu Reppan Dōmei
States and territories disestablished in 1871